Michael Lockley (born April 20, 1988) is a former American football linebacker. He played college football at Florida Atlantic University. He played for the Jacksonville Jaguars and Montreal Alouettes.

Early years
Lockley lettered in football, weightlifting and track and field at Olympia High School in Orlando, Florida. He recorded 110 tackles and seven blocked kicks in his high school career. He earned All-Orange County and All-District honors his senior year. He was also named Olympia's Athlete of the Year. Lockley played in the East-West Metro Senior All-Star Game.

College career
Lockley was a four-year football letterman for the Florida Atlantic Owls. He finished his college career with 234 total tackles, 13.5 tackles for loss, 
two sacks and three forced fumbles. He also blocked four field goal attempts. Lockley was an All-Sun Belt second-team selection his senior year.

Professional career
Lockley was signed by the Jacksonville Jaguars on July 26, 2011. He was fined $20,000 for a hit on New England Patriots wide receiver Taylor Price in the first preseason game of 2011. He was released by the Jaguars on September 3, 2011 and signed to the Jaguars' practice squad on September 4, 2011. Lockley was promoted to the active roster on November 8, 2011. He made his NFL debut on special teams on November 13, 2011 against the Indianapolis Colts. Lockley was released by the Jaguars on December 27, 2011. He played in seven games for the Jaguars.

Lockley signed with the Montreal Alouettes on June 8, 2012. He recorded 24 total tackles and 3 sacks during the 2012 season. He was released by the Alouettes on June 21, 2013.

References

External links
Just Sports Stats
NFL Draft Scout

Living people
1988 births
Players of American football from Orlando, Florida
Players of Canadian football from Orlando, Florida
American football linebackers
Canadian football linebackers
African-American players of American football
African-American players of Canadian football
Florida Atlantic Owls football players
Jacksonville Jaguars players
Montreal Alouettes players
21st-century African-American sportspeople
20th-century African-American people